HMS Constant was an Archer–class gun-brig of the Royal Navy, launched in 1801 for service against the French during the French Revolutionary and Napoleonic Wars. She was variously stationed in English home waters, the Baltic, the Caribbean, and off the coast of Spain, and was responsible for the capture of at least seven enemy vessels during her fifteen years at sea. The Royal Navy sold Constant at Chatham Dockyard in 1816.

Construction 

Constant was one of ten Archer-class gun-brigs ordered as a batch in December 1800 to a design by Navy Surveyor Sir William Rule. The gun-brigs were intended to bolster the Royal Navy's capacity to hunt small French privateers, and to act as anti-invasion craft should France attempt to land troops in the British Isles.

In keeping with her class, Constant was two-masted and brig-rigged, with an overall length of  including bowsprit, a  keel, and measuring 179  tons burthen. She was also heavily armed relative to her size, with two 18 or 32-pounder bow carronades and ten 18-pounder carronades in side ports along her deck.

Constants crew complement was 35, including a Navy Lieutenant, a sailing master, a surgeon's mate, midshipman, six petty officers and 25 able or ordinary seamen. The crew was supported by a detachment of 15 Royal Marines, bringing total on-board personnel to 50 men.

Naval service
Constant was commissioned in May 1801 under Lieutenant James Bremer and stationed in English home ports for the following two years. In April 1803 she sailed to Leith in Scotland for patrols in the North Sea, including to hunt for privateers seeking to attack the British whaling fleet. She returned to Deptford at the conclusion of the whaling season, and in August 1803 her command was transferred to Lieutenant John Stokes who would remain with her for the next ten years.

Under Stokes' command Constant was initially stationed in the English Channel and off the Dutch coast. In 1806 she was active in pursuing and seizing Dutch merchant vessels, capturing at least five including a  brig and a  hoy. The captured vessels were auctioned for prize money at Great Yarmouth in November 1806 and February 1807, alongside their assorted cargoes of tallow, wine and herring.

Constant may also have recaptured the British merchant ship Fortune which had been seized by a French privateer in February 1807 during a voyage from Newcastle upon Tyne to Jamaica.

In 1808 Constant was assigned to convoy duty in the Baltic, returning to England for repairs and refitting at Northfleet in February and March 1809. After a further voyage to the Baltic, Constant was reassigned to Channel patrols. The British vessels gave chase and forced a brig in the convoy to seek shelter close to shore where she was protected by two batteries of French cannons. The water was too shallow for Surveillante to engage the brig directly. Instead her ship's boats were lowered to assault and board the brig and bring her out to sea. Constant was also brought close to shore to support the attack, with Stokes' crew exchanging fire with French troops located on the beach and in caves. The brig was boarded and captured without British casualties, and Surveillante and Constant returned to open waters with their prize.

In January 1809, Constant was driven ashore on the coast of Sweden. She was refloated, repaired, and returned to service.

Constants final victory at sea occurred on 21 April 1813. Briefly stationed in the Caribbean, she encountered and captured the 2-gun French privateer L'Olympe off the Îles des Saintes near Guadeloupe. Constant then returned to England.

In late 1813 she operated off the coast of Spain. In July–August, Constant was part of a squadron of some 17 vessels that participated in the siege of San Sebastián. Because of the shallowness of the water, only the smaller vessels could approach closely enough to bring their guns to bear on the town's defenses. In 1847 the Admiralty awarded the clasp "St. Sebastian" to the Naval General Service Medal to all surviving naval participants at the siege.

On 13 October 1813  caused the destruction of the French 16-gun brig Flibustier (1810) in the mouth of the Adour. Flibustier had been in St Jean de Luz sheltering where shore batteries could protect her when she sought to escape because of the approach of Wellington's army. She started out during a "dark and stormy night", but Telegraph immediately pursued her. After an action lasting three-quarters of an hour, the French saw  and Constant coming up to join the engagement. Flibustiers crew set her on fire and escaped ashore; she then blew up.

In May she returned the captain and crew of the Post Office Packet Service ship  from Madeira to Penzance. (An American privateer had captured her on 8 May and put them on board a Russian vessel that had carried them to Madeira.)
 
Constant was decommissioned at Chatham Dockyard, and Captain Stokes and his crew paid off to join other vessels.

Fate
After decommissioning, Constant was left tied up at Chatham with her guns and masts removed. She declared surplus to Navy requirements in 1815 when the Treaty of Paris formally brought the war with France to an end. She was sold at Chatham Dockyard on 15 February 1816 for a total sum of £600.

Notes

References

Bibliography
 
 

Brigs of the Royal Navy
1801 ships
Ships built in Kent
Ships built on the River Thames
Ships built in Deptford
Maritime incidents in 1809
Shipwrecks of Sweden